The 100th Infantry Battalion (Dai Hyaku Hohei Daitai) is the only infantry unit in the United States Army Reserve.  In World War II, the then-primarily Nisei battalion was composed largely of former members of the Hawaii Army National Guard. The 100th saw heavy combat during World War II, starting in September 1943 and continuing after being attached as a battalion of the Nisei 442nd Regimental Combat Team in June 1944. The unit was unofficially nicknamed the Purple Heart Battalion, with the motto "Remember Pearl Harbor".

Based at Fort Shafter, Honolulu, Hawaii, the 100th Battalion continues the legacy of the 442nd Infantry Regiment, officially designated as 100th Battalion/442nd Infantry Regiment. The 100th Battalion/442nd Infantry Regiment has maintained an alignment with the active 25th Infantry Division since a reorganization in 1972. This alignment has resulted in the 100th's mobilization for combat duty in the Vietnam War and the Iraq War. The 100th Infantry Battalion is staffed with reservists from Hawaii, American Samoa, Guam, Saipan and Washington.

Background 

On the morning of 7 December 1941, the Empire of Japan attacked Pearl Harbor, marking the beginning of World War II for the United States. After the attack, Japanese Americans and those of Japanese descent faced prejudice at home. Chaos ensued in the hours that followed the Pearl Harbor attack, but the 298th and 299th Hawaii National Guard prepared for an invasion, cleared the rubble, donated their blood, and aided the wounded. However, three days after the attack, the unit's rifles were stripped from them because of the ethnicity of members; eventually those rifles were returned. Nisei that were a part of the ROTC program at the University of Hawaii were discharged from the Hawaii Territorial Guard. Those former members eventually formed the Varsity Victory Volunteers.

At 11:30 a.m. martial law was declared, and Governor Joseph Poindexter told President Franklin D. Roosevelt that his greatest fear was sabotage by the large Japanese population in Hawaii. The FBI rounded up known Japanese sympathizers, Buddhist priests, language school principals and teachers, civic and business leaders, fishermen, and instructors of Judo and related martial arts.  The War Department reassigned soldiers of Japanese ancestry on the mainland, had all Japanese Americans on the West Coast rounded up and placed in internment camps around the U S, discharged those of Japanese descent from the Hawaii Territorial Guard, and had all Japanese Americans reclassified as 4-C: enemy aliens. 

General Delos Emmons, appointed military governor on 17 December, supported placing Japanese Americans in internment camps and having them reclassified as enemy aliens, but he wanted to give them a chance to prove their patriotism. After General Emmons agreed to let the Varsity Victory Volunteers form, a confidential memo was sent to the War Department in early April 1942 stating that 2,000 Japanese American soldiers served, and many more who wished to serve to demonstrate their loyalty to the United States. Their desire was to organize into a fighting force to be sent to Europe or Africa to fight the Germans and Italians, but the request was later denied by the War Department.

Formation 
As the Battle of Midway was well underway on 4 June 1942, 1,432 Nisei of the Hawaii National Guard had their weapons taken away and boarded the U.S. Army transport USAT , formerly a Matson liner, under the cover of night and shipped to the mainland without saying goodbye to their family or loved ones. Under the title "Hawaiian Provisional Infantry Battalion" the week-long zigzag journey took them to a port in Oakland where they were designated the 100th Infantry Battalion on 12 June 1942. The unit number was an indication of the Army's recently formulated plan for a modern organization for Combat Arms. Under normal prewar Army procedures, all infantry battalions were organic to the regiment they were a part of and were known as, for instance, "1st Battalion, 5th Regiment." With the new system of organization, the infantry regiment was reorganized as a headquarters with no organic battalions, but with three separate battalions attached. The headquarters was organized into three combat commands that could be dispatched on separate combat actions with units that were attached. One infantry battalion would be assigned to a combat command, with attachments from the higher headquarters reserve. The 100th, however, was not initially attached to a regiment. It came to be known unofficially as the "One-Puka-Puka" (Puka means "hole" in Hawaiian).

Camp McCoy and Camp Shelby 

In Oakland, the 100th boarded a train to their final destination, Camp McCoy, Wisconsin. Immediately following their arrival to Camp McCoy many of the Nisei felt animosity and distrust from fellow soldiers and military and political leaders. The 100th was quartered in tents, four soldiers per tent, which contained a bunk bed, blanket, towels, and backpack. It would be several months until the Nisei moved into military barracks. Eventually soldiers were permanently placed into military units, such as Companies A through E, and pushed through physical, marksmanship, and tactical training.

Some of the white officers and NCO's appointed to the 100th were schooled in psychology and were ordered to test their physical and military capabilities but most of all their loyalty. The Nisei competed with other companies in marksmanship, baseball, softball, physical combat such as scuffles, boxing, and wrestling.

On one such occasion that happened to prove the loyalty and bravery of the new recruits, five Nisei soldiers received the Soldier's Medal for their rescue of several local civilians from drowning on a frozen Wisconsin lake. On one occasion, about 25 of the Japanese-American soldiers were sent to a secret training mission on a small island, Cat Island, near the mouth of the Mississippi River. Some top military officers thought that the "Jap" soldiers smelled differently, and that the Nisei soldiers would give off a similar scent. So for three months these 25 Nisei were ordered to train attack dogs to "smell Japs." The training didn't work.

Training at Camp McCoy lasted six months until on 6 January 1943 the 100th Battalion was transferred to Camp Shelby, Mississippi. The 100th was attached to the 85th Division under Major General Wade Haislip and would receive even tougher training than they did at Camp McCoy. Upon arrival at Camp Shelby the 100th received the same amount of skepticism as they did at McCoy. The 100th successfully passed the training exercises. At Camp Shelby where 100th received its most intense and advanced training and then was sent to Camp Clairborne, Louisiana for field exercises and war games.

On return from Camp Clairborne, the 100th met up with the newly formed 442nd Regimental Combat Team on 16 July. On 20 July 1943 the 100th received its battalion colors and motto, "Remember Pearl Harbor," as requested by the unit.

Africa and Italy 
After training at Camp McCoy, Wisconsin, and Camp Shelby, Mississippi, the battalion deployed from Shelby on 11 August by train to Camp Kilmer, New Jersey and then to the Mediterranean on 21 August 1943.

The 100th arrived in Oran, North Africa on 2 September 1943 but was refused by General Dwight D. Eisenhower, then the commander of the North African Theater of Operations. Lieutenant General Mark Wayne Clark, commanding the United States Fifth Army, accepted the offer, and the 100th became a part of the 133rd Infantry Regiment, 34th Infantry Division, in place of the regiment’s 2nd Battalion that had been assigned to guard Allied installations in England, and took part in training with Caucasian soldiers. On 19 September, the 34th Division sailed from Africa to southeast of Naples, with the 100th with them.

The unit were to fight in the Italian Campaign and entered combat on 29 September 1943, near Salerno in Southern Italy. The unit advanced  in 24 hours for a week against strong enemy resistance which allowed them to take Benevento, an important rail center and road intersection. The 100th crossed the Volturno River three times, taking on heavy German machine gun fire and rocket launchers before driving the German force even further north.

Monte Cassino 

At the top of Monte Cassino stood a grand but old monastery, a key target for the 5th Army. To take the Gustav Line, the Allies would have to descend into the Rapido River valley, traverse two miles of open fields filled with landmines, mud, and knee-deep cold water, cross a swift-moving river, and barbed wire and up the steep, rocky slopes, to the 1500-foot peak of Monte Cassino. From there they would have to ascend still higher to a four-story fortress, with 10-foot-thick stone walls. This was the St. Benedictine monastery. The battle commenced in January. Here they earned their nickname the "Purple Heart Battalion." At night, A and C companies passed their way through the river reaching the wall where the enemy was located and held their ground under intense fire into the next day. B Company was met with heavy machine gun fire as their cover by the smoke screen was blown away leaving only 14 of the original 187 men in B Company to reach the wall.

The three companies were immediately pulled back to San Micheli the next night. The 100th then was ordered to take Castle Hill, which they did on 8 February. The hill was held for four days dealing with not only machine gun fire but tanks as well. The hill was a key location for it was close to the monastery but the 34th Division's right and left flanks were unable to hold their positions because of heavy German resistance. The 100th was again ordered back.

After three days of bombing, the second assault commenced. In one platoon of the 100th only five of forty soldiers survived. The 100th again was pulled back into reserve and replaced by British and Indian soldiers after nearly taking Cassino. War correspondents calling the 100th's soldiers "little men of iron" and the "purple heart battalion." This would be the last time Nisei of the original 100th would see combat at Monte Cassino as they were taken back to San Michele to rest and reorganize. From that point on, for the rest of the war, replacements from the new volunteer 442nd Regimental Combat Team began filling its ranks.

There were over 50,000 allied casualties in the battle. Casualties took the 100th's numbers from 1300 5 months prior to nearly 500. Cassino didn't fall until 17 May. After Cassino, the 100th began to receive its first replacements from the 442nd.  The battalion was later awarded the Distinguished Unit Citation (later redesignated the Presidential Unit Citation) for its actions on 26–27 June.

Anzio, Rome, and the 442nd
In March 1944, the 133rd Infantry’s 2nd Battalion rejoined the regiment from England, but the 100th Battalion still remained perpetually associated with the 34th Infantry Division. Following Monte Cassino, the 100th was soon deployed at the Anzio beachhead on 26 March 1944. The battlefield at Anzio was very similar to battlefields in World War I as there was a large stretch of land between both opposing forces declared as "No Man's Land" and both sides didn't go on a large-scale offensive. The sides only fought at night. During the day, soldiers slept. The fall of Monte Cassino finally led to the end of the stalemate on 17 May 1944. On 23 May the allies went on the offensive to drive the Germans north. However, the allies needed more information about the enemy, so the 100th was ordered to capture a German soldier. Lieutenant Young-Oak Kim, a Korean American born in Los Angeles, California, and Nisei PFC Irving Akahoshi from the 100th volunteered for the mission and captured two German soldiers. On the push to Rome, Lanuvio, the final German stronghold, fell to the 100th Infantry Battalion.

"We had been sitting and living in foxholes at Anzio some 63 days. Then the big push out and the capture of Rome. They (100th Battalion) wiped out the last heavy German resistance we met some 12 miles south of Rome and then it was practically a walk into the city."

The 100th was ordered to stay at the roadside on 4 June 10 kilometers from Rome. They watched other troops march by and never saw Rome. Because of its combat record, the 100th was allowed to keep their original designation, giving the newly formed all-Nisei fighting unit the name 100th/442nd Regimental Combat Team, attached to the 34th Infantry Division.

Demobilization and rebirth

The 442nd RCT was inactivated in Honolulu in 1946, but reactivated in 1947 in the U.S. Army Reserve. It was mobilized in 1968 to refill the Strategic Reserve during the Vietnam War, and carries on the honors and traditions of the unit. Today, the 100th Battalion, 442nd Infantry, is the only ground combat unit of the Army Reserve. The battalion headquarters is at Fort Shafter, Hawaii, with subordinate units based in Hilo, American Samoa, Saipan, Guam, and Washington. The only military presence in American Samoa consists of the battalion's B company.

In August 2004, the battalion was mobilized for duty in Iraq. Stationed at Logistics Support Area Anaconda in the city of Balad, which is located about 50 miles northwest of Baghdad. Lt. Colonel Colbert Low assumed command of the battalion only a few weeks after the battalion arrived at Logistical Support Area Anaconda. In early 2006, the 100th had returned home. One soldier was killed by an improvised explosive device attack. Four members of the battalion were killed in action, and several dozen injured, before the battalion returned home. During the year-long deployment, one of Charlie Company's attached platoons, discovered over 50 weapons caches. Unlike the soldiers of World War II who were predominantly Japanese Americans, these soldiers came from as far away as Miami, Florida, Tennessee, Alaska and included soldiers from Hawaii, Philippines, Samoa and Palau. For their actions in Iraq the unit received the Meritorious Unit Commendation.

The unit was once again deployed in 2009. The unit was called up alongside the 3rd brigade, 25th Infantry Division; and was assigned as an element of the 29th Infantry Brigade Combat Team. Nominally deployed to Kuwait, it conducted patrols into Iraq, leading to two fatalities; those patrols consisted of more than a million miles of driving conducting convoy duty. During the unit's deployment, several dozen of the unit's American Samoan servicemembers became naturalized U.S. citizens while in Kuwait.

In October 2021, C Company officially moved from American Samoa to Joint Base Lewis–McChord in Washington.

Recognition

The nation's highest award for combat valor, the Medal of Honor, was conferred upon twenty-one members of the 100th Infantry Battalion and the 442nd Regimental Combat Team of World War II.

On 5 October 2010, Congress approved the granting of the Congressional Gold Medal to the 442nd Regimental Combat Team and the 100th Infantry Battalion, as well as the 6,000 Japanese Americans who served in the Military Intelligence Service during the war. The Nisei Soldiers of World War II Congressional Gold Medal was collectively presented on 2 November 2011.

In 2012, the surviving members of the 442nd RCT were made chevaliers of the French Légion d'Honneur for their actions contributing to the liberation of France during World War II and their heroic rescue of the Lost Battalion outside of Biffontaine.

Lineage following World War II 
 Inactivated 15 August 1946 at Honolulu, Hawaii
 Allotted 27 March 1947 to the Organized Reserves
 Activated 31 July 1947 with headquarters at Fort DeRussy, Hawaii
 Organized Reserves redesignated 25 March 1948 as the Organized Reserve Corps;
 Organized Reserve Corps redesignated 9 July 1952 as the Army Reserve
 Reorganized and redesignated 29 May 1959 as the 100th Battle Group, 442d Infantry
 Reorganized and redesignated 1 May 1964 as the 100th Battalion, 442d Infantry
 Ordered into active military service 13 May 1968 at Fort DeRussy, Hawaii; released from active military service 12 December 1969 and reverted to reserve status
 Location of headquarters changed 1 September 1994 to Fort Shafter, Hawaii
 Ordered into active military service 16 August 2004 at Fort Shafter, Hawaii
 Redesignated 1 October 2005 as the 100th Battalion, 442d Infantry Regiment
 Released from active military service 13 March 2006 and reverted to reserve status
 Ordered into active military service 19 August 2008 at Fort Shafter, Hawaii; released from active military service 22 September 2009 and reverted to reserve status

Campaign participation credit 
 World War II:
 Naples-Foggia;
 Anzio;
 Rome-Arno;
 North Apennines;
 Rhineland;
 Po Valley
 War on Terrorism:
 Iraq:
 Iraqi Governance
 National Resolution

Decorations 
 Presidential Unit Citation (Army) for BELVEDERE
 Presidential Unit Citation (Army) for BIFFONTAINE AND FORET DOMANIALE DE CHAMP
 Presidential Unit Citation (Army) for BIFFONTAINE
 Presidential Unit Citation (Army) for FRANCE AND ITALY
 Presidential Unit Citation (Army) for GOTHIC LINE
 Meritorious Unit Commendation (Army) for IRAQ 2005-2006
 Meritorious Unit Commendation (Army) for IRAQ 2008-2009

See also 
 Go for Broke!, a film that dramatizes the lives and wartime experiences of the 442nd Regimental Combat Team and the 100th Infantry Battalion's Hawaiian troops.
 Go for Broke Monument
 Only the Brave (2006), an independent film directed by Lane Nishikawa, which is a fictional account of the rescue of the Lost Battalion.
 Japanese American internment
 Japanese American Memorial to Patriotism During World War II
 Japanese American service in World War II
 Military history of Asian Americans#World War II

Notes

References 
 Moulin, Pierre. U.S. Samurais in Bruyeres: People of France and Japanese Americans: Incredible Story. U.S. Army Museum of Hawaii. . .

External links 
 Official website of the 100th Infantry Battalion Veterans organization
 Club 100 Puka Puka Parade 1964Nov-v17n11
 World War II photographs of the 100th Infantry Battalion
 The "Home of Heroes" website about the 100th Infantry Battalion
 Brothers in Valor Monument at Fort DeRussy, Oahu, Hawaii
 Densho Encyclopedia article on the 100th Infantry Battalion

1942 establishments in the United States
American military personnel of Japanese descent
Congressional Gold Medal recipients
Recipients of the Presidential Unit Citation (United States)
Infantry battalions of the United States Army
Japanese-American history
Military units and formations disestablished in 1946
Military units and formations established in 1942
Military units and formations established in 1947
Military units and formations in Hawaii